The 2017–18 Detroit Pistons season was the 77th season of the franchise, the 70th in the National Basketball Association (NBA), and the first in Midtown Detroit. The Pistons moved from The Palace of Auburn Hills to the new Little Caesars Arena before the start of the season. This was the first season where the Pistons have played in Detroit on a regular basis since 1978. This would also be the last season with Stan Van Gundy being both the team's head coach and President of Basketball Operations.

Draft picks

Roster

Standings

Division

Conference

Game log

Preseason 

|- style="background:#fbb;"
| 1
| October 4
| Charlotte
| 
| Andre Drummond (16)
| Andre Drummond (15)
| Ish Smith (7)
| Little Caesars Arena13,882
| 0–1
|- style="background:#bfb;"
| 2
| October 6
| Atlanta
| 
| Avery Bradley (18)
| Eric Moreland (13)
| Ish Smith (8)
| Little Caesars Arena14,496
| 1–1
|- style="background:#bfb;"
| 3
| October 9
| Indiana
| 
| Marjanović, Jackson & Smith (14)
| Eric Moreland (7)
| Ish Smith (9)
| Little Caesars Arena12,721
| 2–1
|- style="background:#fbb;"
| 4
| October 10
| @ Toronto
| 
| Ish Smith (22)
| Andre Drummond (11)
| Ish Smith (8)
| Air Canada Centre16,893
| 2–2
|- style="background:#fbb;"
| 4
| October 13
| @ Milwaukee
| 
| Avery Bradley (26) 
| Andre Drummond (22)
| Andre Drummond (7)
| BMO Harris Bradley Center9,528
| 2–3

Regular season 

|- style="background:#bfb;"
| 1
| October 18
| Charlotte
| 
| Tobias Harris (27)
| Andre Drummond (12)
| Reggie Jackson (8)
| Little Caesars Arena20,491
| 1–0
|- style="background:#fbb;"
| 2
| October 20
| @ Washington
| 
| Reggie Jackson (21)
| Andre Drummond (12)
| Reggie Jackson (5)
| Verizon Center16,337
| 1–1
|- style="background:#bfb;"
| 3
| October 21
| @ New York
| 
| Tobias Harris (31)
| Andre Drummond (12)
| Reggie Jackson (7)
| Madison Square Garden19,812
| 2–1
|- style="background:#fbb;"
| 4
| October 23
| Philadelphia
| 
| Reggie Jackson (16)
| Andre Drummond (14)
| Reggie Jackson (7)
| Little Caesars Arena13,709
| 2–2
|- style="background:#bfb;"
| 5
| October 25
| Minnesota
| 
| Tobias Harris (34)
| Andre Drummond (15)
| Ish Smith (13)
| Little Caesars Arena13,790
| 3–2
|- style="background:#bfb;"
| 6
| October 28
| @ L.A. Clippers
| 
| Drummond & Jackson (15)
| Andre Drummond (17)
| Reggie Jackson (7)
| Staples Center17,247
| 4–2
|- style="background:#bfb;"
| 7
| October 29
| @ Golden State
| 
| Avery Bradley (23)
| Andre Drummond (18)
| Drummond & Jackson (5)
| Oracle Arena19,596
| 5–2
|- style="background:#fbb;"
| 8
| October 31
| @ L.A Lakers
| 
| Harris & Jackson (18)
| Andre Drummond (12)
| Drummond & Jackson (5)
| Staples Center17,569
| 5–3

|- style="background:#bfb;"
| 9
| November 3
| Milwaukee
| 
| Andre Drummond (24)
| Andre Drummond (15)
| Reggie Jackson (8)
| Little Caesars Arena17,207
| 6–3
|- style="background:#bfb;"
| 10
| November 4
| Sacramento
| 
| Avery Bradley (24)
| Andre Drummond (19)
| Reggie Jackson (7)
| Little Caesars Arena17,683
| 7–3
|- style="background:#bfb;"
| 11
| November 8
| Indiana
| 
| Tobias Harris (23)
| Andre Drummond (21)
| Reggie Jackson (6)
| Little Caesars Arena14,407
| 8–3
|- style="background:#bfb;"
| 12
| November 10
| Atlanta
| 
| Reggie Jackson (22)
| Andre Drummond (20)
| Andre Drummond (7)
| Little Caesars Arena16,687
| 9–3
|- style="background:#bfb;"
| 13
| November 12
| Miami
| 
| Tobias Harris (25)
| Andre Drummond (17)
| Ish Smith (7)
| Little Caesars Arena16,236
| 10–3
|- style="background:#fbb;"
| 14
| November 15
| @ Milwaukee
| 
| Avery Bradley (28)
| Andre Drummond (17)
| Avery Bradley (5)
| Bradley Center15,494
| 10–4
|- style="background:#fbb;"
| 15
| November 17
| @ Indiana
| 
| Jackson & Bradley (16)
| Andre Drummond (15)
| Reggie Jackson (7)
| Bankers Life Fieldhouse17,188
| 10–5
|- style="background:#bfb;"
| 16
| November 19
| @ Minnesota
| 
| Andre Drummond (20)
| Andre Drummond (16)
| Reggie Jackson (8)
| Target Center16,069
| 11–5
|- style="background:#fbb;"
| 17
| November 20
| Cleveland
| 
| Tobias Harris (11)
| Andre Drummond (8)
| Reggie Jackson (6)
| Little Caesars Arena20,587
| 11–6
|- style="background:#bfb;"
| 18
| November 24
| @ Oklahoma City
| 
| Andre Drummond (17)
| Andre Drummond (14)
| Jackson & Smith (4)
| Chesapeake Energy Arena18,203
| 12–6
|- style="background:#bfb;"
| 19
| November 27
| @ Boston
| 
| Tobias Harris (31)
| Andre Drummond (22)
| Reggie Jackson (7)
| TD Garden18,624
| 13–6
|- style="background:#bfb;"
| 20
| November 29
| Phoenix
| 
| Reggie Jackson (23)
| Drummond & Harris (7)
| Andre Drummond (7)
| Little Caesars Arena18,096
| 14–6

|- style="background:#fbb;"
| 21
| December 1
| @ Washington
| 
| Tobias Harris (15)
| Andre Drummond (17)
| Andre Drummond (7)
| Verizon Center17,885
| 14–7
|- style="background:#fbb;"
| 22
| December 2
| @ Philadelphia
| 
| Tobias Harris (27)
| Andre Drummond (11)
| Andre Drummond (6)
| Wells Fargo Center20,562
| 14–8
|- style="background:#fbb;"
| 23
| December 4
| @ San Antonio
| 
| Reggie Jackson (27)
| Andre Drummond (15)
| Avery Bradley (4)
| AT&T Center18,288
| 14–9
|- style="background:#fbb;"
| 24
| December 6
| @ Milwaukee
| 
| Andre Drummond (27)
| Andre Drummond (20)
| Andre Drummond (6)
| Bradley Center15,841
| 14–10
|- style="background:#fbb;"
| 25
| December 8
| Golden State
| 
| Avery Bradley (25) 
| Andre Drummond (17)
| Drummond & Smith (4)
| Little Caesars Arena20,491
| 14–11
|- style="background:#fbb;"
| 26
| December 10
| Boston
| 
| Tobias Harris (19)
| Andre Drummond (15)
| Ish Smith (5)
| Little Caesars Arena18,776
| 14–12
|- style="background:#fbb;"
| 27
| December 12
| Denver
| 
| Langston Galloway (18)
| Andre Drummond (15)
| Ish Smith (5)
| Little Caesars Arena15,494
| 14–13
|- style="background:#bfb;"
| 28
| December 14
| @ Atlanta
| 
| Tobias Harris (19)
| Andre Drummond (19)
| Andre Drummond (9)
| Philips Arena13,548
| 15–13
|- style="background:#bfb;"
| 29
| December 15
| @ Indiana
| 
| Andre Drummond (23)
| Andre Drummond (13)
| Harris, Kennard, Johnson & Smith (4)
| Bankers Life Fieldhouse14,687
| 16–13
|- style="background:#bfb;"
| 30
| December 17
| Orlando
| 
| Reggie Bullock (20)
| Eric Moreland (8)
| Smith & Jackson (6)
| Little Caesars Arena16,312
| 17–13
|- style="background:#fbb;"
| 31
| December 20
| @ Dallas
| 
| Anthony Tolliver (18)
| Andre Drummond (13)
| Reggie Jackson (5)
| American Airlines Center19,580
| 17–14
|- style="background:#bfb;"
| 32
| December 22
| New York
| 
| Tobias Harris (24)
| Andre Drummond (15)
| Reggie Jackson (8)
| Little Caesars Arena16,922
| 18–14
|- style="background:#bfb;"
| 33
| December 26
| Indiana
| 
| Tobias Harris (30)
| Andre Drummond (18)
| Reggie Jackson (13)
| Little Caesars Arena20,451
| 19–14
|- style="background:#fbb;"
| 34
| December 28
| @ Orlando
| 
| Tobias Harris (21)
| Andre Drummond (18)
| Drummond & Smith (5)
| Amway Center18,846
| 19–15
|- style="background:#bfb;"
| 35
| December 30
| San Antonio
| 
| Reggie Bullock (22)
| Andre Drummond (17)
| Andre Drummond (6)
| Little Caesars Arena19,671
| 20–15

|- style="background:#fbb;"
| 36
| January 3
| @ Miami
| 
| Tobias Harris (19)
| Boban Marjanović (9)
| Smith, Bradley & Buycks (4)
| American Airlines Arena19,600
| 20–16
|- style="background:#fbb;"
| 37
| January 5
| @ Philadelphia
| 
| Tobias Harris (14)
| Andre Drummond (8)
| Dwight Buycks (6)
| Wells Fargo Center20,592
| 20–17
|- style="background:#bfb;"
| 38
| January 6
| Houston
| 
| Tobias Harris (27)
| Harris & Moreland (8)
| Moreland & Smith (4)
| Little Caesars Arena18,046
| 21–17
|- style="background:#fbb;"
| 39
| January 8
| @ New Orleans
| 
| Tobias Harris (25)
| Andre Drummond (14)
| Avery Bradley (6)
| Smoothie King Center12,874
| 21–18
|- style="background:#bfb;"
| 40
| January 10
| @ Brooklyn
| 
| Drummond & Harris (22)
| Andre Drummond (20)
| Bradley, Drummond & Smith (5)
| Barclays Center13,457
| 22–18
|- style="background:#fbb;"
| 41
| January 13
| @ Chicago
| 
| Avery Bradley (26)
| Andre Drummond (15)
| Ish Smith (6)
| United Center21,613
| 22–19
|- style="background:#fbb;"
| 42
| January 15
| Charlotte
| 
| Bullock & Harris  (20)
| Andre Drummond (10)
| Ish Smith (10)
| Little Caesars Arena17,200
| 22–20
|- style="background:#fbb;"
| 43
| January 17
| @ Toronto
| 
| Andre Drummond (25)
| Andre Drummond (17)
| Dwight Buycks (6)
| Air Canada Centre19,800
| 22–21
|- style="background:#fbb;"
| 44
| January 19
| Washington
| 
| Tobias Harris (17)
| Andre Drummond (21)
| Andre Drummond (8)
| Little Caesars Arena14,744
| 22–22
|- style="background:#fbb;"
| 45
| January 21
| Brooklyn
| 
| Tobias Harris (20)
| Andre Drummond (13)
| Galloway & Harris (5)
| Little Caesars Arena17,544
| 22–23
|- style="background:#fbb;"
| 46
| January 24
| Utah
| 
| Andre Drummond (30)
| Andre Drummond (24)
| Drummond, Galloway, Johnson & Kennard (4)
| Little Caesars Arena15,682
| 22–24
|- style="background:#fbb;"
| 47
| January 27
| Oklahoma City
| 
| Tobias Harris (21)
| Andre Drummond (13)
| Ish Smith (9)
| Little Caesars Arena20,491
| 22–25
|- style="background:#fbb;"
| 48
| January 28
| @ Cleveland
| 
| Harris & Tolliver (20)
| Andre Drummond (11)
| Smith & Tolliver (5)
| Quicken Loans Arena20,562
| 22–26
|- style="background:#bfb;"
| 49
| January 30
| Cleveland
| 
| Stanley Johnson (26)
| Andre Drummond (22)
| Drummond & Smith (7)
| Little Caesars Arena18,508
| 23–26

|- style="background:#bfb;"
| 50
| February 1
| Memphis
| 
| Blake Griffin (24)
| Andre Drummond (15)
| Blake Griffin (5)
| Little Caesars Arena17,481
| 24–26
|- style="background:#bfb;"
| 51
| February 3
| Miami
| 
| Ish Smith (25)
| Andre Drummond (20)
| Griffin & Smith (7)
| Little Caesars Arena18,747
| 25–26
|- style="background:#bfb;"
| 52
| February 5
| Portland
| 
| Blake Griffin (21)
| Andre Drummond (17)
| Ish Smith (7)
| Little Caesars Arena13,810
| 26–26
|- style="background:#bfb;"
| 53
| February 7
| Brooklyn
| 
| Blake Griffin (25)
| Andre Drummond (27)
| Blake Griffin (7)
| Little Caesars Arena15,114
| 27–26
|- style="background:#fbb;"
| 54
| February 9
| L.A. Clippers
| 
| Bullock & Griffin (19)
| Andre Drummond (17)
| Blake Griffin (8)
| Little Caesars Arena16,697
| 27–27
|- style="background:#fbb;"
| 55
| February 11
| @ Atlanta
| 
| Andre Drummond (25)
| Andre Drummond (15)
| Ish Smith (7)
| Philips Arena15,214
| 27–28
|- style="background:#fbb;"
| 56
| February 12
| New Orleans
| 
| Blake Griffin (22)
| Andre Drummond (21)
| Jameer Nelson (5)
| Little Caesars Arena14,453
| 27–29
|- style="background:#bfb;"
| 57
| February 14
| Atlanta
| 
| Ish Smith (22)
| Andre Drummond (15)
| Griffin & Smith (9)
| Little Caesars Arena15,849
| 28–29
|- align="center"
|colspan="9" bgcolor="#bbcaff"|All-Star Break
|- style="background:#fbb;"
| 58
| February 23
| Boston
| 
| Ish Smith (20)
| Andre Drummond (17)
| Ish Smith (6)
| Little Caesars Arena20,491
| 28–30
|- style="background:#fbb;"
| 59
| February 25
| @ Charlotte
| 
| Blake Griffin (20)
| Andre Drummond (14)
| Ish Smith (8)
| Spectrum Center17,894
| 28–31
|- style="background:#fbb;"
| 60
| February 26
| @ Toronto
| 
| Andre Drummond (18)
| Andre Drummond (18)
| Blake Griffin (5)
| Air Canada Centre19,800
| 28–32
|- style="background:#bfb;"
| 61
| February 28
| Milwaukee
| 
| Stanley Johnson (19)
| Andre Drummond (16)
| Blake Griffin (7)
| Little Caesars Arena16,146
| 29–32

|- style="background:#fbb;"
| 62
| March 2
| @ Orlando
| 
| Bullock & Ennis (21)
| Andre Drummond (15)
| Blake Griffin (9)
| Amway Center17,223
| 29–33
|- style="background:#fbb;"
| 63
| March 3
| @ Miami
| 
| Blake Griffin (31)
| Andre Drummond (18)
| Blake Griffin (6)
| American Airlines Arena19,600
| 29–34
|- style="background:#fbb;"
| 64
| March 5
| @ Cleveland
| 
| Blake Griffin (25)
| Andre Drummond (9)
| Ish Smith (6)
| Quicken Loans Arena20,562
| 29–35
|- style="background:#fbb;"
| 65
| March 7
| Toronto
| 
| Blake Griffin (31)
| Andre Drummond (21)
| Ish Smith (7)
| Little Caesars Arena17,769
| 29–36
|- style="background:#bfb;"
| 66
| March 9
| Chicago
| 
| Blake Griffin (25)
| Andre Drummond (17)
| Blake Griffin (8)
| Little Caesars Arena17,406
| 30–36
|- style="background:#fbb;"
| 67
| March 13
| @ Utah
| 
| Luke Kennard (18)
| Andre Drummond (11)
| Jameer Nelson (4)
| Vivint Smart Home Arena18,306
| 30–37
|- style="background:#fbb;"
| 68
| March 15
| @ Denver
| 
| Blake Griffin (26)
| Andre Drummond (17)
| Blake Griffin (9)
| Pepsi Center18,697
| 30–38
|- style="background:#fbb;"
| 69
| March 17
| @ Portland
| 
| Andre Drummond (18)
| Andre Drummond (22)
| Blake Griffin (7)
| Moda Center19,727
| 30–39
|- style="background:#bfb;"
| 70
| March 19
| @ Sacramento
| 
| Blake Griffin (26)
| Andre Drummond (16)
| Blake Griffin (7)
| Golden 1 Center17,583
| 31–39
|- style="background:#bfb;"
| 71
| March 20
| @ Phoenix
| 
| Blake Griffin (26)
| Andre Drummond (10)
| Blake Griffin (10)
| Talking Stick Resort Arena17,400
| 32–39
|- style="background:#fbb;"
| 72
| March 22
| @ Houston
| 
| Blake Griffin (21)
| Andre Drummond (20)
| Blake Griffin (10)
| Toyota Center18,055
| 32–40
|- style="background:#bfb;"
| 73
| March 24
| Chicago
| 
| Anthony Tolliver (25)
| Andre Drummond (20)
| Blake Griffin (9)
| Little Caesars Arena19,139
| 33–40
|- style="background:#bfb;"
| 74
| March 26
| L.A. Lakers
| 
| Reggie Jackson (20)
| Andre Drummond (18)
| Stanley Johnson (6)
| Little Caesars Arena18,718
| 34–40
|- style="background:#bfb;"
| 75
| March 29
| Washington
| 
| Andre Drummond (24)
| Andre Drummond (23)
| Reggie Jackson (8)
| Little Caesars Arena18,268
| 35–40
|- style="background:#bfb;"
| 76
| March 31
| @ New York
| 
| Andre Drummond (22)
| Andre Drummond (17)
| Ish Smith (6)
| Madison Square Garden19,812
| 36–40

|- style="background:#bfb;"
| 77
| April 1
| @ Brooklyn
| 
| Reggie Jackson (29)
| Andre Drummond (14)
| Stanley Johnson (4)
| Barclays Center16,097
| 37–40
|- style="background:#fbb;"
| 78
| April 4
| Philadelphia
| 
| Anthony Tolliver (25)
| Andre Drummond (15)
| Ish Smith (12)
| Little Caesars Arena18,395
| 37–41
|- style="background:#bfb;"
| 79
| April 6
| Dallas
| 
| Reggie Jackson (24)
| Andre Drummond (15)
| Reggie Jackson (7)
| Little Caesars Arena18,768
| 38–41
|- style="background:#fbb;"
| 80
| April 8
| @ Memphis
| 
| Anthony Tolliver (19)
| Andre Drummond (18)
| Ish Smith (11)
| FedExForum16,044
| 38–42
|- style="background:#fbb;"
| 81
| April 9
| Toronto
| 
| Luke Kennard (20)
| Kennard & Moreland (7)
| Reggie Jackson (9)
| Little Caesars Arena17,529
| 38–43
|- style="background:#bfb;"
| 82
| April 11
| @ Chicago
| 
| Luke Kennard (23)
| Eric Moreland (17)
| Reggie Jackson (10)
| United Center21,342
| 39–43

Player statistics

Season

|- align="center" bgcolor=""
| †‡
|| 25 || 25 || 33.2 || .433 || .348 || .784 || 6.6 ||style="background:#eb003c;color:white;" |6.2 || .44 || .36 ||style="background:#eb003c;color:white;" |19.8
|- align="center" bgcolor="f0f0f0"
| ‡
|| 48 || 48 || 32.6 || .451 || .409 || .846 || 5.1 || 2.0 || .71 || .31 || 18.1
|- align="center" bgcolor=""
| ‡
|| 40 || 40 || 31.7 || .409 || .381 || .763 || 2.4 || 2.1 || 1.15 || .18 || 15.0
|- align="center" bgcolor="f0f0f0"
| 
| 78 ||style="background:#eb003c;color:white;" |78 ||style="background:#eb003c;color:white;" |33.7 || .529 || .000 || .605 ||style="background:#eb003c;color:white;" |16.0 || 3.0 ||style="background:#eb003c;color:white;" |1.46 ||style="background:#eb003c;color:white;" |1.63 || 15.0
|- align="center" bgcolor=""
| 
| 45 || 45 || 26.7 || .426 || .308 || .836 || 2.8 || 5.3 || .60 || .09 || 14.6
|- align="center" bgcolor="f0f0f0"
| 
| 62|| 52 || 27.9 || .489 || .445 || .796 || 2.5 || 1.5 || .76 || .21 || 11.3
|- align="center" bgcolor=""
| 
|style="background:#eb003c;color:white;" |82 || 35 || 24.9 || .486 || .347 || .698 || 2.7 || 4.4 || .78 || .24 || 10.9
|- align="center" bgcolor="f0f0f0"
| 
| 79 || 14 || 22.2 || .464 || .436 || .797 || 3.1 || 1.1 || .41 || .27 || 8.9
|- align="center" bgcolor=""
| 
| 69 || 50 || 27.4 || .375 || .286 || .772 || 3.7 || 1.6 || 1.38 || .20 || 8.7
|- align="center" bgcolor="f0f0f0"
| 
| 73 || 9 || 20.0 || .443 || .415 || .855 || 2.4 || 1.7 || .60 || .18 || 7.6
|- align="center" bgcolor=""
| †
| 27 || 8 || 20.4 || .457 || .304 || .767 || 2.5 || .8 || .56 || .22 || 7.5
|- align="center" bgcolor="f0f0f0"
| 
| 29 || 0 || 14.7 || .414 || .333 || .878 || 1.4 || 2.0 || .66 || .07 || 7.4
|- align="center" bgcolor=""
| ‡
| 19 || 1 || 9.0 || .519 || .000 || .800 || 3.0 || .7 || .21 || .32 || 6.2
|- align="center" bgcolor="f0f0f0"
| 
| 58 || 2 || 14.9 || .371 || .344 || .805 || 1.6 || 1.0 || .60 || .09 || 6.2
|- align="center" bgcolor=""
| 
| 8 || 0 || 17.0 || .417 || .000 || .867 || 4.0 || .6 || .13 || .38 || 5.4
|- align="center" bgcolor="f0f0f0"
| 
| 38 || 0 || 8.7 || .363 || .333 || .862 || 2.1 || .5 || .13 || .00 || 4.0
|- align="center" bgcolor=""
| †
| 7 || 0 || 16.6 || .282 || .071 ||style="background:#eb003c;color:white;" |1.000 || 1.1 || 3.3 || .57 || .14 || 3.7
|- align="center" bgcolor="f0f0f0"
| 
| 67 || 3 || 12.0 || .541 || .000 || .379 || 4.1 || 1.2 || .46 || .76 || 1.9
|- align="center" bgcolor=""
| 
| 3 || 0 || 2.3 || .500 ||style="background:#eb003c;color:white;" |.500 || .000 || 0.0 || 0.0 || 0.0 || 0.0 || 1.0
|- align="center" bgcolor="f0f0f0"
| 
| 2 || 0 || 3.0 || .250 || .000 || .000 || 2.0 || 0.0 || .0 || .0 || 1.0
|- align="center" bgcolor=""
| †‡
| 3 || 0 || 3.0 || style="background:#eb003c;color:white;" |1.000 || .000 || .000 || .3 || .3 || .00 || .00 || 0.7
|- align="center" bgcolor="f0f0f0"
| 
| 2 || 0 || 4.0 || .000 || .000 || .000 || 1.0 || .0 || .0 || .0 || 0.0
|}
†Denotes player spent time with another team before joining the Pistons. Stats reflect time with the Pistons only.
‡Denotes traded mid-season.

Transactions

Overview

Trades

Free agency

Re-signed

Additions

Subtractions

References

Detroit Pistons seasons
Detroit Pistons
Detroit Pistons
Detroit Pistons